EVW may refer to:
 European Voluntary Workers, the collective name given to continental Europeans invited by the British government to work in the UK in the immediate Post-World War II period
 Electronic Visa Waiver, an electronic documentation for the citizens of Kuwait, Oman, Qatar, and the UAE to enter the United Kingdom
 Empty Vehicle Weight, an Aircraft weight measurement